The International Federation of Plantation and Agricultural Workers (IFPAAW) was a global union federation bringing together unions representing land workers.

History
The federation was created on December 2, 1959, when the Plantation Workers International Federation (PWIF) merged with the International Landworkers' Federation (ILF). The ILF consisted of European unions representing agricultural workers, while the PWIF consisted of mostly workers on plantations in poorer countries, but also included some former affiliates of the defunct International Federation of Tobacco Workers.

By 1976, IFPAW claimed 3 million members, and maintained this level for the remainder of its existence.  At some point, it changed its name slightly to the International Federation of Plantation, Agricultural and Allied Workers, while retaining the IFPAW abbreviation.

IFPAW pioneered collective bargaining at the international level in 1988, when it signed an agreement with Danone.

The federation merged into the International Union of Food and Allied Workers' Associations at 1 January 1994, which renamed itself as the International Union of Food, Agricultural, Hotel, Restaurant, Catering, Tobacco and Allied Workers' Association.

Affiliates
In 1960, the following unions were affiliated to the federation:

Leadership

General Secretaries
1960: Tom Bavin
1976: Stanley Correa
1982: José Vargas
1988: Börje Svensson

Presidents
1960: Harold Collison
1976: Tom Bavin
1982: Börje Svensson
1988: P. P. Narayanan
1992: Post vacant

References

Trade unions established in 1960
Trade unions disestablished in 1994
Global union federations
Agriculture and forestry trade unions
Agricultural organisations based in Switzerland